Moradabad (also Romanized as Morādābād; also known as Naz̧ar ‘Alīvand-e Morādābād) is a village in Suri Rural District, Suri District, Rumeshkhan County, Lorestan Province, Iran. At the 2006 census, its population was 610, in 124 families.

References 

Populated places in Rumeshkhan County